Polemovirus is a genus of viruses. Commercial cultivars of Euphorbia pulcherrima serve as natural hosts. There is only one species in this genus: Poinsettia latent virus.  Its RNA suggests a replication mode like that of poleroviruses, whereas the coat protein sequence is closely related to that of sobemoviruses.

Structure

Viruses in Polemovirus are non-enveloped, with icosahedral geometries, and T=3 symmetry. Genomes are linear and non-segmented.

Life cycle
Viral replication is cytoplasmic, and is lysogenic. Entry into the host cell is achieved by penetration into the host cell. Replication follows the positive stranded RNA virus replication model. Positive stranded RNA virus transcription is the method of transcription. The virus exits the host cell by tubule-guided viral movement.
Commercial cultivars of Euphorbia pulcherrima serve as the natural host.

References

External links
 
 ICTV

Positive-sense single-stranded RNA viruses
Riboviria
Virus genera